Chris Porter may refer to:
 
Chris Porter (basketball) (born 1978), American professional basketball player
Chris Porter (comedian) (born 1979), American comedian
Chris Porter (footballer, born 1885) (1885–1915), English amateur football inside forward
Chris Porter (footballer, born 1979), English football goalkeeper and coach
Chris Porter (footballer, born 1983), English footballer for Oldham Athletic
Chris Porter (ice hockey) (born 1984), Canadian professional ice hockey left winger
Chris Porter (producer) (active from 1976),  British record producer, engineer and narrator

See also
Christopher Porter (disambiguation)